Carn Arthen (meaning Arthur's rock-pile) is farmstead  south-east of Camborne near to Tuckingmill in Cornwall, England.

See also

 List of farms in Cornwall

References

Farms in Cornwall